Maalgudi Days is a 2016 Indian Malayalam-language emotional suspense thriller scripted and directed by brothers Vivek, Visakh, and Vinod in their directorial debut. Set in an imaginary school named Malgudi Residential School, it is based on a real incident that happened in the Indian state of Nagaland in the year 2002. The film stars Anoop Menon, Bhama, Janaki Menon, Vishal Krishna, and Saiju Kurup in the lead roles. It was released on 8 January 2016.

Janaki Menon won the Best Child Actor (Female) at Kerala State Film Awards 2015 for portraying the character of Atheena in the film.
Master Vishal Krishna and Janaki Menon won Best Child artists Kerala Film Critics Association Awards for portraying the character of Milan and Atheena.

Plot 

The story happens in a winter season at a hill station near Vagamon.  The landmark of the place is Malgudi National Public School which has “winter vacation” in place of summer vacation. The two child characters are Atheena and Milan pursuing their studies in this school.

Atheena:-9 years old girl who is under depression after the accidental death of her father and is referred to this school by a psychiatrist to recover from the haunting memories of her father's demise, but carries his spectacles with her.

Milan:(Vishal Krishna)-9 years old boy who is troublesome for the entire staff and other children in the school because of his mischievous nature.
Milan and Atheena, though poles apart in character, soon become friends. In fact, it is the diversity in their nature which brings them together.

Zephan:- The lead role in the movie who is an escaped convict now. A flash back shows that he is an artist and craftsman by profession and was living happily with his wife and daughter, in a nearby village. One night when their daughter is away, his life turns topsy-turvy, after giving shelter to 4 unknown men in his house. What ensues is a series of unfortunate incidents and now he is on the run for his life, trying to evade police arrest. He seeks refuge in an abandoned house adjacent to the school.

Atheena and Milan accidentally meet Zephan at the deserted house behind the school. Though frightened in the beginning, later they feel sympathetic for him as he is badly injured. Even though he is not disclosing his identity and his miseries, they get a feeling that he could be innocent. They start helping him with food, water and medicines which eventually builds up a strong emotional bond between them. He impresses them with his innovative art work (Origami style).

Advent of winter:- Principal declares vacation and Zephan realizes this would be best time for him to plan his escape. On the final day, Atheena realizes that she missed to take her father's spectacles and she along with Milan gets down from the school bus and sneaks their way to the hostel room. By chance, security locks the hostel without realizing that children are inside.

The second half of the movie is about the 48 hours of their struggle to escape from the hostel room surviving the thirst, hunger, cold and fear. 
What happens to Zephan? Will he succeed in proving his innocence? What happens to children in the end? The answers to these questions form the climax of the movie. 
Milan tries to escape by using the bathroom window and he falls on the roof below. Meanwhile, Zephan comes back to the school after he saw the news reporting that Atheena and Milan were missing. He sees Milan lying on the roof and calls out to him. Milan accidentally falls and Zephan catches him. Then Zephan goes and finds Atheena and he lays them on the stairs leading to the school office. He walks to the nearest shop to get them water but it is closed. He then sees the police standing nearby and for the sake of the children he gives in and then the police finds the kids and takes them to the hospital. The kids wake up later and they are taken by their parents. While going, Atheena sees Zephan sitting on a rock with the police standing behind him. She tells her mother to stop and she runs out with her mother running behind her. The police shoots Zephan in the head and he dies. Atheena hears the shot and stops and her mother takes her to car and they go home.Zephan requests the police to get his daughter admitted in the Malgudi school and says that there are 2 little ones who will take care of his daughter Jenny. Later it is seen that Adheena and Milan are sitting on a bench with Zephan's daughter Jenny in their school.

Cast 
 Anoop Menon as Zephan, the mysterious man
 Bhama as Janet
 Janaki Menon as Atheena
 Vishal Krishna as Milan
 Priyanka Nair as Swathy
 Saiju Kurup as Sub. Inspector Manu Varma
 T P Madhavan as Principal
 Irshad as Maoist Sudarshan
 Sathyadev as Akbar Khan, Commando Officer
 Noby Marcose as School Security Guard

Production 
Pre-production work started in January 2015, and the principal photography commenced on 9 July 2015. With locations in Munnar, Peerumedu, Vagamon, Mont Fort School at Yercaud and Trivandrum, the shooting was completed in 35 days. Despite its title, the film is not related to the short story collection by R. K. Narayan.

Awards 
Janaki Menon won the Best Child Actor (Female) at 46th Kerala State Film Awards for portraying the character of Atheena.
Vishal Krishna and Janaki Menon won Best Child artists Kerala Film Critics Association Awards for portraying the character of Milan and  Atheena.

References

External links
 

2016 films
2010s Malayalam-language films
Films shot in Munnar
Films shot in Thiruvananthapuram